Gerónimo Bortagaray Derregibus (born 5 August 2000) is a Uruguayan professional footballer who plays as a centre-back for Greek Super League club PAS Giannina.

References

2000 births
Living people
Uruguayan footballers
Super League Greece players
PAS Giannina F.C. players
Association football defenders